The margay (Leopardus wiedii) is a small wild cat native to Central and South America. A solitary and nocturnal cat, it lives mainly in primary evergreen and deciduous forest.

Until the 1990s, margays were hunted illegally for the wildlife trade, which resulted in a large population decrease. Since 2008, the margay has been listed as Near Threatened on the IUCN Red List because the population is thought to be declining due to loss of habitat following deforestation.

The scientific name Felis wiedii was used by Heinrich Rudolf Schinz in 1821 in his first scientific description of the margay, in honour of Prince Maximilian of Wied-Neuwied, who collected specimens in Brazil.

Characteristics
The margay is very similar to the larger ocelot (Leopardus pardalis) in appearance, although the head is a little shorter, the eyes larger, and the tail and legs longer. Unlike most other cats, the female possesses only two teats.

Its fur is brown and marked with numerous rows of dark brown or black rosettes and longitudinal streaks. The undersides are paler, ranging from buff to white, and the tail has numerous dark bands and a black tip. The backs of the ears are black with circular white markings in the centre.

Distribution and habitat
The margay is distributed from the tropical lowlands in Mexico through Central America to Brazil and Paraguay. In Mexico it has been recorded in 24 of the 32 states, ranging northward up the coastal lowlands and Sierra Madres as far north as of Coahuila, Nuevo Leon, and Tamaulipas on the US border in the east and southern Sonora in the west. The southern edge of its range reaches Uruguay and northern Argentina. It inhabits almost exclusively dense forests, ranging from tropical evergreen forest to tropical dry forest and high cloud forest. The margay has sometimes been observed in coffee and cocoa plantations.

The only record from the US was collected sometime before 1852 near Eagle Pass, Maverick County, Texas, and it is currently considered locally extinct in Texas. The margay's presence in the United States is considered "uncertain" by the IUCN Red List. Fossil margay remains have been collected in Pleistocene deposits in Orange County, Texas, along the Sabine River, and it is thought to have ranged over considerable portions of southern Texas at one time.

Fossil evidence of margays or margay-like cats dubbed Leopardus amnicola has been found in Florida, Georgia, and South Carolina dating to the Pleistocene, suggesting that they had an even wider distribution in the past.

Behavior and ecology

The margay is a skillful climber, and colloquially it is sometimes called the tree ocelot because of this ability. It spends most of the time in trees, leaping after and chasing birds and monkeys through the treetops. It can turn its ankles up to 180 degrees, so it can grasp branches equally well with its fore and hind paws, and it is able to jump up to  horizontally. They also utilize their long tails to maintain balance while climbing. Morphological adaptation such as these is a strong indication that the margay is well equipped to thrive in ecosystems such as rainforests in which vegetation provides the wild with protection from possible threats. Additionally, scientists that have conducted behavioral studies on margays found that population density was higher in environments with substantial amount of trees and minimal human disturbance.

Diet
Dietary studies based on stomach contents and fecal analysis showed that it feeds on small mammals including monkeys, birds, eggs, lizards, tree frogs and arthropods. It also hunts Ingram's squirrel, eats grass, fruit and other vegetation, most likely to help digestion. It is able to hunt its prey entirely in trees. However, margays do sometimes hunt on the ground, and have been reported to eat terrestrial prey, such as guinea pigs.

Reproduction and lifecycle
Female margays are in estrus for four to ten days over a cycle of 32 to 36 days, during which they attract males with a long, moaning call. The male responds by yelping or making trilling sounds, and also by rapidly shaking his head from side to side, a behavior not seen in any other cat species. Copulation lasts up to sixty seconds and is similar to that of domestic cats; it takes place primarily in the trees and occurs several times while the female is in heat. Unlike other felid species, margays are not induced ovulators.

Gestation lasts about 80 days and generally results in the birth of a single kitten (very rarely, there are two), usually between March and June. Kittens weigh  at birth. This is relatively large for a small cat and is probably related to the long gestation period. The kittens open their eyes at around two weeks of age and begin to eat solid food at seven to eight weeks. Margays reach sexual maturity at twelve to eighteen months of age and have been reported to live more than 20 years in captivity.

Cubs suffer from a 50% mortality rate. Unless mortality rates were previously lower, this is not a factor in the population decline. Simplifying, provided a pair of cats can raise 2 kittens to adulthood in their lifetime, population would be in equilibrium. Assuming one year to reach breeding age, then as long as the cats that survive infancy reach 5 years of age on average, then the pair would produce 4 kittens, of which 2 would survive infancy, thus providing a replacement pair. Coupled with the problems they have breeding in captivity, this makes the prospect of increasing the population very difficult.

It uses scent marking to indicate its territory, including urine spraying and leaving scratch marks on the ground or on branches. Its vocalisations all appear to be short range; it does not call over long distances.

A margay has been observed to mimic the vocalisation of a pied tamarin (Saguinus bicolor) infant while hunting. This represents the first observation of a Neotropical predator employing this type of mimicry.

Taxonomy
Felis wiedii was the scientific name proposed by Heinrich Rudolf Schinz in 1821 for a zoological specimen from Brazil. Felis macroura was proposed by Maximilian von Wied in 1825 who described margays that he obtained in the jungles along the Mucuri River in Brazil.
In the 20th century, several type specimens were described and proposed as new species or subspecies:

 Felis glaucula by Oldfield Thomas in 1903 was an adult female cat skin and skull from Jalisco in central Mexico.
 Felis wiedii vigens by Thomas in 1904 was an adult male cat skin and skull from Igarapé-Assu near Pará in Brazil.
 Felis pirrensis by Edward Alphonso Goldman in 1914 was an adult female cat skin and skull from Cana in eastern Panama.
 Margay glaucula nicaraguae by Joel Asaph Allen in 1919 was an adult male cat skin and skull from Volcan de Chinandego in Nicaragua.
 Felis glaucula oaxacensis and F. g. yucatanicus by Edward William Nelson and Goldman in 1931 were an adult male skin and skull from Cerro San Felipe in Oaxaca, and a female cat skin from Yucatan, Mexico, respectively.
 Felis wiedii cooperi by Nelson in 1943 was a skin of a male cat from Eagle Pass, Texas.

Results of a genetic study of margay mitochondrial DNA samples indicate that three phylogeographic groups exist. Therefore, three subspecies are currently considered valid taxa:

 L. w. wiedii south of the Amazonas
 L. w. vigens north of the Amazonas
 L. w. glauculus in Central America

Local names
In Portuguese, it is called  or simply . In the Guaraní language, the term  originally referred only to the margay but is now also used for domestic cats.

References

External links

 IUCN/SSC Cat Specialist Group: Margay Leopardus wiedii
 Smithsonian Wild: Margay (Leopardus wiedii)
 Ecology of the Ocelot and Margay

Leopardus
Mammals described in 1821
Felids of South America
Mammals of Mexico
Mammals of Brazil
Mammals of Venezuela
Mammals of Paraguay
Mammals of Ecuador
Mammals of Peru
Mammals of Bolivia
Mammals of Colombia
Fauna of the Guianas
Mammals of Guyana
Felids of Central America
ESA endangered species
Species endangered by the pet trade